Gorgis Ismail is a former Iraqi football forward who played for Iraq between 1962 and 1969. He played 9 matches and scored 3 goals.

Career statistics

International goals
Scores and results list Iraq's goal tally first.

References

Iraqi footballers
Iraq international footballers
Living people
Association football forwards
Year of birth missing (living people)